Schlater is a town in Leflore County, Mississippi, United States. The population was 310 at the 2010 census, down from 388 at the 2000 census. It is part of the Greenwood, Mississippi micropolitan area.

Geography
Schlater is located in northwestern Leflore County at  (33.640156, -90.347246). Mississippi Highway 442 passes through the town, leading east  to U.S. Route 49E and west  to Doddsville and U.S. Route 49W.

McNutt Lake is a narrow waterway that passes through the town, connecting Ashland Brake to the east with the Quiver River to the west, part of the Yazoo River watershed.

Demographics

As of the 2010 United States Census, there were 310 people living in the town. The racial makeup of the town was 68.7% Black, 29.0% White and 1.0% from two or more races. 1.3% were Hispanic or Latino of any race.

As of the census of 2000, there were 388 people, 141 households, and 105 families living in the town. The population density was 332.8 people per square mile (128.0/km). There were 150 housing units at an average density of 128.7 per square mile (49.5/km). The racial makeup of the town was 38.92% White, 60.57% African American and 0.52% Asian.

There were 141 households, out of which 29.8% had children under the age of 18 living with them, 44.7% were married couples living together, 22.7% had a female householder with no husband present, and 25.5% were non-families. 24.8% of all households were made up of individuals, and 11.3% had someone living alone who was 65 years of age or older. The average household size was 2.75 and the average family size was 3.29.

In the town, the population was spread out, with 32.2% under the age of 18, 9.3% from 18 to 24, 25.5% from 25 to 44, 20.1% from 45 to 64, and 12.9% who were 65 years of age or older. The median age was 34 years. For every 100 females, there were 86.5 males. For every 100 females age 18 and over, there were 81.4 males.

The median income for a household in the town was $23,816, and the median income for a family was $25,000. Males had a median income of $21,667 versus $13,571 for females. The per capita income for the town was $10,022. About 34.9% of families and 44.3% of the population were below the poverty line, including 65.0% of those under age 18 and 14.3% of those age 65 or over.

Education 
It is in the Greenwood-Leflore School District.

The town was served by the Leflore County School District. Effective July 1, 2019 this district consolidated into the Greenwood-Leflore School District.

Notable people
 Means Johnston, Jr., admiral in the United States Navy
 Ben Jones, race car driver
 Woodrow Stanley, Michigan state politician

References

Towns in Leflore County, Mississippi
Towns in Mississippi
Greenwood, Mississippi micropolitan area